Yahyaabad (also Romanized as Yaḩyáābād) is a village in Beyza Rural District, Beyza District, Sepidan County, Fars Province, Iran. At the 2006 census, its population was 90, in 17 families.

References 

Populated places in Beyza County